Wotan is a mystical supervillain appearing in American comic books published by DC Comics. The character was created by Gardner Fox and Howard Sherman, first appearing in More Fun Comics #55 (1940). The character is a major antagonist to Doctor Fate, serves as an archenemy to various incarnations.  

Originally a woman of prehistoric times, the woman who would become Wotan was sexually assaulted by male members of her tribe. Turning to magic, she took revenge and became a god-like entity to her tribe while learning to extend her life through reincarnation and became curious about the source of cruelty in humanity. Evetually, in a male body, he adopted the "Wotan" name based upon Germanic and Norse mythology and gain a lust for power and knowledge, putting them at odds with Doctor Fate and other magical characters.  After the New 52 reboot, the character was then moved to the Earth 2 universe with a similar background; named Karel Wotan, she is cursed by Nabu when she arrogantly challenged the mystic sorcerer by turning her skin green so he can recognize her no matter whom she may reincarnate into. In a male body, he plots to usurp Nabu's power and is challenged by Earth 2's Doctor Fate, Khalid Ben-Hassin. The character's original incarnation would later briefly reappear in DC Rebirth. 

Wotan has appeared in several media, having been adapted in both Batman: The Brave and the Bold and Young Justice animated series.

Publication history
Wotan first appeared in More Fun Comics #55 (May 1940) and was created by Gardner Fox and Howard Sherman.

Fictional character biography

Pre/Post Crisis 

The being now known as Wotan started out life as a Stone Age woman who was raped by someone claiming to be a servant of God. She studied the black arts and became such a powerful sorceress that she was worshiped as a goddess. She later learned how to switch from body to body and then to direct her own reincarnation, eventually becoming the male being now known as Wotan. In the Golden Age, Wotan encountered first Green Lantern and then the sorcerer known as Doctor Fate where he became Fate's nemesis.

At one point, he was pulled back in time with other JSA enemies by the time-traveller Per Degaton to assist in capturing the JSA and stop them from interfering in his attempt to change the events of Pearl Harbor. Wotan uses his magic aura to hold the JSA captive in caves beneath an island. The plan is foiled by the actions of the All-Star Squadron. When the Spectre is released from the aura and frees the other members, Per Degaton goes back in time, thus erasing everybody's memories of this event and returning them to their proper places.

During the second volume of The Spectre in the eighties, he tries to take over the body of the sorceress Zatanna, but fails. In the early nineties, Wotan discovers the temple where the last body of the being known as Yahweh - God Himself - lay entombed, still seething with mystical power. While fighting the current Doctor Fate and the Justice League, Wotan enters the tower with the intention of absorbing the power, confronting God himself, and supplanting Him. Instead, he emerges blinded, his evil having been burned out by God's power. Declaring that Wotan will never menace anybody again, one of Yahweh's servants spirits Wotan away.

Earth 2 
In The New 52 (a reboot of DC's continuity), Wotan is reintroduced in issue #9 of Earth 2 as Karel Wotan. Her original incarnation once again as a woman, Wotan claimed to be  "the mage of an organization that seeks to augment its control of magic in the world" although this was later revealed to be a lie. She is portrayed as an ancient sorcerer who started life as a female Viking and later mastered the arts of sorcery, having lived several lifetimes, both male and female. An encounter with Nabu the Wise left her skin forever green and unable to enter the Tower of Fate which held the helmet Wotan desperately sought after.

Powers and abilities
Due to centuries of sorcerous studies, Wotan is a master sorcerer and whose forte is black magic. Among their capabilities in magic includes dimensional travel, spell-casting, and has the power to transfer their soul into another body, directing their own form of reincarnation. At the height of Wotan's power, he is powerful enough to directly challenge Doctor Fate. In addition, Wotan is a skilled and capable scientist, having created technology considered far more advanced than anything created in the 20th century. 

However, Wotan possesses poor skills in hand-to-hand combat and instead relies on magical powers.

Other versions 
In DC Universe, the continuation of DC Rebirth, there is a character called Wotan II who is part of a group of alien children called the Injustice Army. As the group idolized Earth's villains, Wotan II idolized the original Wotan.

In other media

Television
 Wotan appeared in the Batman: The Brave and the Bold episode "The Eyes of Despero!", voiced by James Arnold Taylor. He attempted to break into the Library of Infinity only to be stopped by Doctor Fate and Batman. While Wotan managed to knock off Doctor Fate's helmet, he was caught off-guard when he was K.O.'d by Doctor Fate's punch.
 Wotan is featured in Young Justice, voiced by Bruce Greenwood. In "Independence Day", Zatara briefly appears on a display in the library of the Hall of Justice to request support after stating that Wotan is using The Amulet of Aten to blot out the sun. Wotan later appears as a member of the Injustice League. In "Misplaced", Wotan, Felix Faust, Blackbriar Thorn and Wizard are summoned by Klarion the Witch Boy to assist in a ceremony on Roanoke Island that apparently splits reality into two dimensions by channeling mystic energy through a gem referred to as Ambre Jeune Perdu.

References

Who's Who:The Definitive Directory of the DC Universe, volume 26
Who's Who: The Definitive Directory of the DC Universe Update '88, volume 4
Who's Who in the DC Universe 1990, #1 (this last is the first Who's Who issue to reveal Wotan's full origin for the first time).

DC Comics supervillains
DC Comics characters who use magic
Comics characters introduced in 1940
Characters created by Gardner Fox
Fictional Vikings
Fictional German people
Fictional characters with dimensional travel abilities
Fictional characters with death or rebirth abilities
Fictional characters with absorption or parasitic abilities